Daud Haider is a Bangladeshi poet who was forced into exile after writing a poem that "insulted" religion including Islam. American Center, International PEN have described him as "distinguished poet".

Early life
Haider was born on 21 February 1952 at Dohar of Pabna district.

Career
His poem style has been described as more focused on "feeling of the masses". He was the literary editor of the Dainik Sambad based in Dhaka, Bangladesh. He wrote a poem criticizing religion. His was physically attacked for his works. He was imprisoned by the government of Bangladesh. President Sheikh Mujibur Rahman was blamed for forcing him into exile. His ancestral house was destroyed by arson and one of his relatives was killed. He moved to exile in Kolkata, India before moving to Berlin, Germany.

Personal life 
Haider is an atheist.

Awards
 "The best poem of Asia" from the London-based Poetry Society award in 1973.

References

Living people
1952 births
20th-century Bangladeshi poets
Bangladeshi atheists
Bangladeshi male poets
Bangladeshi former Muslims
20th-century male writers